Hutka is a village and small municipality in Bardejov District in the Prešov Region of north-east Slovakia.

History 
In historical records the village was first mentioned in 1618.

Geography 
The municipality lies at an altitude of 400 metres and covers an area of 3.694 km².
It has a population of about 88 people.

Genealogical resources

The records for genealogical research are available at the state archive "Statny Archiv in Presov, Slovakia"

 Roman Catholic church records (births/marriages/deaths): 1695-1901 (parish B)
 Greek Catholic church records (births/marriages/deaths): 1805-1901 (parish B)

See also
 List of municipalities and towns in Slovakia

References

External links 
 
 
https://web.archive.org/web/20070513023228/http://www.statistics.sk/mosmis/eng/run.html
Surnames of living people in Hutka

Villages and municipalities in Bardejov District
Šariš